Adelphacaridae is a family of mites belonging to the order Sarcoptiformes.

Genera:
 Adelphacarus Grandjean, 1952
 Aphelacarus Grandjean, 1932
 Beklemisheria Zachvatkin, 1945
 Monoaphelacarus Subias & Arillo, 2002

References

Sarcoptiformes